Stiobia is a genus of minute freshwater snails with an operculum, aquatic gastropod molluscs or micromolluscs in the family Hydrobiidae.

Species
Species within the genus Stiobia'''' include:
 Sculpin snail, Stiobia nana''

References

 ITIS info

 
Hydrobiidae
Taxonomy articles created by Polbot